"Ek Hasina Thi" (translation: There was A Beautiful Lady) is a song from the Hindi film Karz, composed by the duo of Laxmikant–Pyarelal, written by Anand Bakshi and sung by Asha Bhosle and Kishore Kumar. The song was inspired by George Benson's "We As Love".

Picturization
In the film, Rishi Kapoor and Tina Munim features in the Happy Version of the song sung by Kishore Kumar and Asha Bhosle.  Rishi Kapoor mentioned this song as one of the songs that he feared to shoot and one of his favorites. Anupam Kher used to make fun of him using the lyrics of this song often.

Remakes and versions
Throughout the years, the song has been remade several tines and covered by many singers.
In 2020, DJ Harshit Shah remixed the song along with Brazilian Bass. He made this song as a tribute to Rishi Kapoor, who just passed away then. Harshit Shah addressed him as the true showman of Bollywood. 

In January 2022, actor Amit Tandon recreated this song with rehashed music. He himself sang it and cited that he is a big fan of Kishore Kumar, the singer of this song.

Awards
 19th Filmfare Awards
 Best Music Director: Laxmikant–Pyarelal: Won

See also
 Binaca Geetmala annual list 1980

References

External links
 List of Filmfare Award Winners and Nominations, 1953-2005

Hindi film songs
Indian songs
Number-one singles in India
Kishore Kumar songs
1980 songs
Songs with music by Laxmikant–Pyarelal
Asha Bhosle songs
Songs with lyrics by Anand Bakshi